The variable sallow moth (Sericaglaea signata) is a moth of the family Noctuidae. It is found from Connecticut to Florida and west to Missouri and Texas.

The wingspan is 35–43 mm. The forewings of the adults vary widely in color, ranging from light to dark brown or reddish-brown with a purplish gloss. The hindwings are brown, but grayish-brown toward the outer margin. They are on wing from October to May in one generation per year. The adults overwinter.

The larvae feed on the leaves of Quercus, Prunus and Tilia species.

References

Moths described in 1879
Cuculliinae